A partial solar eclipse occurred on Friday, July 13, 2018. A solar eclipse occurs when the Moon passes between Earth and the Sun, thereby totally or partly obscuring the image of the Sun for a viewer on Earth. A partial solar eclipse occurs in the polar regions of the Earth when the center of the Moon's shadow misses the Earth. The moon's penumbra touched a small part of Antarctica, and southern Australia in Tasmania, where the eclipse was observed with a magnitude of about 0.1. The eclipse was also visible in Stewart Island, an island south of New Zealand.

Images

Related eclipses

Eclipses of 2018 
 A total lunar eclipse on January 31.
 A partial solar eclipse on February 15.
 A partial solar eclipse on July 13.
 A total lunar eclipse on July 27.
 A partial solar eclipse on August 11.

Solar eclipses of 2018–2021

Metonic series 
 All eclipses in this table occur at the Moon's ascending node.

References

External links 

 Solar eclipse of July 13, 2018 - gsfc.nasa.gov

2018 in science
2018 7 13
July 2018 events